Nikos Karanikas (born 4 March 1992) is a Greek professional footballer who last played as a right-back for Moldovan Super Liga club Zimbru Chișinău.

Career 
Karanikas started his career from his hometown team AEL. He played for the club's youth teams from 2006 to 2010, until he signed a 5-years professional contract and moved to the first squad upon turning 18, in June 2010. On June 23, 2015 he signed a 3 years contract with PAS Giannina. The summer of 2018 he came back in AEL and signed a 3 years contract. On May 14, 2021 there was an official announcement about the termination of the player's contract by mutual agreement.

References

External links
 Sport Larissa
 AEL 1964 FC Official

1992 births
Living people
Footballers from Larissa
Greek footballers
Association football defenders
Super League Greece players
Athlitiki Enosi Larissa F.C. players
PAS Giannina F.C. players